The Serie B 1991–92 was the sixtieth tournament of this competition played in Italy since its creation.

Teams
Piacenza, Venezia, Casertana and Palermo had been promoted from Serie C, while Lecce, Pisa, Cesena and Bologna had been relegated from Serie A.

Final classification

Results

Relegation tie-breaker

Casertana relegated to Serie C1.

Footnotes

References and sources
Almanacco Illustrato del Calcio - La Storia 1898-2004, Panini Edizioni, Modena, September 2005

Serie B seasons
2
Italy